Belovsky District is the name of several administrative and municipal districts in Russia.
Belovsky District, Kemerovo Oblast, an administrative and municipal district of Kemerovo Oblast
Belovsky District, Kursk Oblast, an administrative and municipal district of Kursk Oblast

See also
Belovsky (disambiguation)

References